Tarlan Ahmadov (born 17 November 1971) is a retired Azerbaijani international football defender who was captain of the national team. During his international career he earned 73 caps, ranking him fourth in Azerbaijan's all time appearances. Ahmadov played his club football in Azerbaijan, Russia, Ukraine and Iran, ending his career with Olimpik Baku in 2009.

Club career
Ahmadov started his career at Termist Baku before moving to Neftchi Baku in 1989 and then Turan Tovuz in 1992. Ahmadov's first adventure playing outside of Azerbaijan was for Terek Grozny during the 1993 season, appearing 14 times. Ahmadov returned to Azerbaijan for the start of the 1993–94 season, signing for Qarabağ. Ahmadov played for Qarabağ for four seasons before heading back to Russia with Anzhi Makhachkala, though it was a short stay, playing five times before signing with Neftchi Baku in 1997. After three season, which included a short spell at Shafa Baku, Ahmadov yet again headed to Russia, this time signing for Fakel Voronezh in the Russian Top Division. After only seven games Ahmadov returned to Neftchi Baku, before moving to Shafa Baku again, having fallen out of favor at Neftchi. With the 2002–03 Azerbaijan Championship not being held, Ahmadov headed to Iran to sign for Esteghlal. After Esteghlal, Ahmadov signed for Volyn Lutsk in the Ukrainian Premier League. Ahmadov returned to Azerbaijan halfway through the 2003–04 with Qarabağ, before moving to Karvan for two seasons and then Olimpik Baku for the final three seasons of his career. Ahmadov retired from football at the end of the 2008–09 season.

Career statistics

Club

International

Honours

Club
Qarabağ
Azerbaijan Cup: 1993
Azerbaijan Premier League Runners-up (1): 1993–94

Karvan
Azerbaijan Premier League Runners-up (1): 2005–06

Olimpik Baku
Azerbaijan Premier League Runners-up (1): 2007–08

National
Soviet Union U-21
UEFA European Under-21 Football Championship (1): 1990

Individual
Azerbaijani Footballer of the Year (1): 1999

References

External links
RSSSF: Tarlan Akhmedov - International Appearances
BBC: Wales v. Azerbaijan

 

1971 births
Living people
Soviet footballers
Azerbaijani footballers
Azerbaijani football managers
Azerbaijani expatriate footballers
Footballers from Baku
Expatriate footballers in Iran
Expatriate footballers in Ukraine
Azerbaijani expatriate sportspeople in Iran
Azerbaijani expatriate sportspeople in Ukraine
Qarabağ FK players
Turan-Tovuz IK players
FC Anzhi Makhachkala players
AZAL PFK players
FC Volyn Lutsk players
Ukrainian Premier League players
FC Fakel Voronezh players
Expatriate footballers in Russia
Russian Premier League players
Association football defenders
FC Akhmat Grozny players
Azerbaijan international footballers